ACM Computing Reviews (CR) is a scientific journal that reviews literature in the field of computer science. It is published by the Association for Computing Machinery and the editor-in-chief is Carol Hutchins (New York University).

See also 
 ACM Guide to Computing Literature
 ACM Computing Surveys
 Algorithms

References

External links 
 

Computing Reviews
Computer science journals
Publications established in 1985
English-language journals
Review journals
1985 establishments in the United States